Sacha Komljenovic (born 10 May 2003) is a Dutch professional footballer who plays as a midfielder for ADO Den Haag.

Early life
Komljenovic was born in Zoetermeer, Netherlands, to a Serbian father and a Russian mother.

Career
After playing youth football for DWO Zoetermeer and DSO Zoetermeer, Komljenovic joined ADO Den Haag's academy in July 2018. In February 2021, Komljenovic signed a professional contract until summer 2023. He broke into Den Haag's first team for the 2021–22 Eerste Divisie, as he made 18 appearances during the regular season. On 10 May 2022, he scored his first goal for the club with a 93rd-minute winner in their 2–1 first leg play-off win over NAC Breda.

References

2003 births
Living people
Dutch footballers
Dutch people of Russian descent
Dutch people of Serbian descent
Footballers from Zoetermeer
Association football midfielders
ADO Den Haag players
Eerste Divisie players